Thouars is a commune in the Deux-Sèvres department in western France. On 1 January 2019, the former communes Mauzé-Thouarsais, Missé and Sainte-Radegonde were merged into Thouars.

It is on the River Thouet. Its inhabitants are known as Thouarsais. The Toarcian stage of the Jurassic takes its name from the town.

History

Although there is evidence of human habitation here 5,000 years ago, it is only in the seventh century that the town appears in the historical record. In the 760s, Thouars found itself in Aquitaine, the most robust fortress in the entire region according to contemporary chroniclers. This was a violent decade as Duke Waïfre, struggling to preserve the independence of Aquitaine, fought against the expansionist ambitions of the French King, Pepin the Short.   In 762, accompanied by his son, the future Charlemagne, appeared outside Thouars. He destroyed the Gallo-Roman town and torched the castle.

In the ninth century the first of a line of viscounts took charge of Thouars: he and his successors would control the fiefdom for more than five centuries until the end of the fourteenth century.  The earliest of these Viscounts of Thouars for whom information survives is Geoffrey I, known as the founder of the Thouars dynasty.   Located at the south of Anjou and at the frontier with Aquitaine, the Viscountcy of Thouars became a rich fiefdom with a strategic location extending from Upper Poitou all the way to the coast.

Aimery IV of Thouars was a companion of William the Conqueror as a commander in the Battle of Hastings.

In Angers in 1199, Guy of Thouars married Constance of Brittany to become Duke of Brittany jure uxoris, and after the death of Constance, Regent of Brittany for her daughter Alix of Thouars. In 1372 the English were expelled from the town by Bertrand du Guesclin.

Thouars was the birthplace of the medieval general Louis de La Trémoille, created duke by Charles IX in 1563. In 1619 his heir Henri de La Trémoille married Marie de la Tour d'Auvergne, sister of Turenne. She razed the old gothic château-fort to build the present château.

Population

Main sights
 
The castle of the Dukes of La Trémoille, designed by Jacques Lemercier and completed in  1635–1638. Its main façade is more than 110 m tall. After the Trémouilles were dispossessed during the French Revolution, the château became a barracks and later a prison. It has been restored for its present use as a middle school.
Walls, with several historical towers (Tour du Prince-de-Galles, Tour Porte au Prévost) dating from the 13th century; a bridge of the same period crosses the Thouet.
Church of Saint-Laon (12th century), subsequently attached to an abbey, whose buildings later became a town hall. The church houses the tomb of Margaret Stewart, first wife of King Louis XI of France.
Church of St. Medard (15th century), in Romanesque style
The Neo-Gothic Chapel of Joan of Arc
Henri-Barré museum

People
Thouars was the birthplace of:
 Louis II de La Trémoille (1460–1525), general
 Charlotte Stanley, Countess of Derby (1599–1664)
 Prosper Depredomme (1918–1997), cyclist
 Jean-Hugues Anglade (born 1955), actor

Thouars is also the final resting place of:
 Margaret Stewart, Dauphine of France (1424–1445), daughter of James I of Scotland.

Twin towns
Thouars is twinned with:
 Hannut, Belgium
 Port-Gentil, Gabon
 Diepholz, Germany
 Międzyrzec Podlaski, Poland
 Helensburgh, Scotland, United Kingdom

See also
 The Toarcian Age of the Jurassic Period of geological time is named for Thouars
Communes of the Deux-Sèvres department

References

External links

Official town website
Château de Thouars

Communes of Deux-Sèvres
Châteaux in Deux-Sèvres
Poitou